Titus Tobler (25 July 1806 – 21 January 1877) was a Swiss Oriental scholar.

Biography
Tobler was born on 25 July 1806 in Stein, Appenzell, Switzerland. He studied and practised medicine. He travelled to Palestine and, after taking part in the political affairs of Switzerland, settled in 1871 in Munich, Germany. He died on 21 January 1877 in Munich.

Works
His principal works are:
 
 
which was supplemented by Beitrag zur medizinischen Topographie von Jerusalem (“A contribution to a medical topography of Jerusalem,” 1855)
 Planographie von Jerusalem (1858)
 Dritte Wanderung nach Palästina (“Third Journey to Palestine,” 1859)
 Bibliographia Geographica Palestinæ (“Geographic bibliography for Palestine,” 1867)

Further reading
 Life by Heim (Zurich, 1879)

References
 

1806 births
1877 deaths
Palestinologists
Swiss orientalists